Pi de les tres branques (in Catalan language, meaning "the three-branched pine") is a dead pine tree located in the countryside near the town of Berga in north-central Catalonia, Spain. It has long been regarded by some Catalan nationalists as representing the unity of the three "Catalan Countries" and is the site of regular political-cultural gatherings.

The tree has been dead since 1915 and is in poor structural condition, due in part to politically-motivated vandalism, but there is a very similar living tree a short distance away known as Pi jove de les tres branques ("the young three-branched pine"), which is regarded as its successor. Both are protected as "monumental trees" by the Catalan Generalitat.

Situation

To the south, separating the valley from Berga town, is the  ridge, home to the  religious complex, and to the north are the Rasos de Peguera mountains and ski resort.

The tree previously dominated the valley's farmed and grazed land, due to its height and full foliage, and was visible from a long distance, as is shown in old photographs. However, much of the surrounding land has now been taken over by forest, and Pi de les Tres Branques now has many other trees in its vicinity, which, together with its current skeletal form, make it much less visible than before.

The valley is traversed by a minor road which terminates at the small settlement of Castellar del Riu at its western end. The road passes close by Pi de les Tres Branques, which is indicated by a signpost.

History

Origin
Although legend places the tree much earlier, it has been estimated that Pi de les Tres Branques took root between 1630 and 1632, when the local farmhouse was built.

Cultural recognition

The tree had been traditionally celebrated as a symbol of the Holy Trinity, and it is still a venue for religious ceremonies. The first reference in extant records was in 1685, when a cartographer wrote that it was known as the Tree of the Trinity. It is also recorded that in 1746, the bishop of Solsona granted indulgences to those who prayed at the site.

In 1876, the landowner of the site, in a letter to a local magazine denying that he was planning to sell the tree for timber, pointed out that it also represented the revolutionary ideals of liberty, equality and fraternity.

The Catalan language cultural revival of the 19th century saw a great increase in Catalan literature and culture. In 1875, playwright  published a play Lo Pi de las Tres Brancas, which is set in Berga and at the tree, and contains a passage suggesting that the tree was already a Catalan national symbol. However, it was the 1888 poem "Lo Pi de les Tres Branques" by the poet Fr Jacint Verdaguer, published in his anthology Pàtria, which brought the tree to widespread attention, converting what was mainly a local religious symbol into a significant secular national symbol. In his poem, Jacint Verdaguer created the so-called 'legend' of the king-child King James I of Aragon who after being released from captivity in Narbonne (France) travelled with his retinue through Catalonia back to his seat at Monzón in Aragon, supposedly spending one of the nights sleeping under Pi de les Tres Branques, and it was there that he had an inspirational dream that he was destined to rule three kingdoms, represented by the three trunks of the tree, conquering the Balearic Islands and the Kingdom of Valencia from the Moors, which in fact he later achieved.

The previous year, Verdaguer had stayed a few days in the nearby Queralt Sanctuary and visited the tree. "Lo Pi de les Tres Branques" recounts the story of James and the tree's symbolism of the Trinity and the unity of the Catalan Countries, and expressed the wish that it be adopted as Catalonia's national tree. The poem has remained the tree's principal literary connection, regularly recited at gatherings there.  It starts and ends with the often-quoted lines "Preguem que sia aqueix Pi / l'arbre sagrat de la pàtria." ("We pray that this Pine will be / the sacred tree of the fatherland.").

It is accepted that in fact Verdaguer invented the story of James's sojourn for his poem, since there is no record of it before then, and that the poem's popularity created the legend.

In 1901, when Verdaguer was presiding at the Floral Games, a traditional Catalan poetry contest, he coined the sobriquet "Guernica of Catalonia" for the tree, referring to the Tree of Guernica, an oak tree which symbolises Basque freedom. He also suggested the tree's trunks symbolised the three major awards of the contest: country, faith, and love.

This new popularity coincided with the slow decay of the tree, which eventually died in 1915.

In 1987 the Catalan regional government listed the tree as a protected "monumental tree", one of the first three such trees (along with Pi Jove and Roure de Can Codorniu in Sant Sadurní d'Anoia). A silhouette of Pi de les Tres Branques (while it was alive) is now used by the government as a generic logo for monumental trees.

Damage and death
Before its death, Pi de les Tres Branques had been attacked several times, for economic and/or political reasons.

In 1901, Jacint Verdaguer reported that a woodcutter had recently tried to cut down one of the trunks, causing it to lean out; damage from which the tree was unlikely to recover. It was also reported that around 1895, cuts had been made to tap the tree for resin, and a fire lit at its base to speed the process. This and other damage prompted the Catalanist Union to erect a high stone wall around the tree in 1907 to protect against further attacks, though it was suggested that the building work also contributed to the subsequent death of the tree. By 1915 the aforementioned wall had been demolished.

In 1910, it was reported that the tree had lost its leaves, though others suggest a date of 1913, and it was completely dead by 1915. Scots pines have a natural lifespan of up to over 700 years, depending on the region.

Many years later, the trunk that was damaged as reported by Verdaguer, was struck by lightning and the top half broke off. The remnant of that trunk is still supported by a small stone wall.

Later damage

Following its death, the tree has continued to be attacked many times by elements opposed to its political symbolism.

In 1939, after the end of the Civil War, supporters of the victorious Nationalist faction started an attempt to topple the tree, but were repelled by local people. It has also been subject to regular minor damage such as anti-Catalan graffiti.

However, the most serious deliberate damage happened during the night of 12/13 May 2014, when the tallest trunk was sawn off at its base with a chainsaw, by unknown perpetrators. Following the vandalism, the severed trunk was stored, and it was eventually decided to re-attach it with artificial supports, several steel straps connecting the trunk to the base; this work was carried out in early July 2015 at a cost of €35,000, shared by the Catalan government and the Barcelona provincial administration.

In January 2016, the tree was again attacked (along with Pi Jove) with a 10 cm chainsaw cut into one of the other trunks. This damage was quickly patched up with steel straps as before.

Pi Jove

Its similarities to the main tree had been noticed as far back as 1810, when the Baron of Maldà mentioned it in his diary.

At the 1921 rally at the site, following a campaign by poet-politician Ventura Gassol, Pi Jove was inaugurated as the successor to the then-dead main tree. Speaking at the event, Gassol invited the landowner, who was present, to donate the tree to the Commonwealth of Catalonia (a semi-recognised autonomous government), but he declined, saying that practical effort is more important than symbols.

It has since become the main attraction for younger and more radical elements of the nationalist movement. The older and younger trees are often simply called "el Pi Vell" (the old pine) and "el Pi Jove" (the young pine) respectively, to distinguish the two.

Along with Pi Vell, Pi Jove was registered as a protected "monumental tree" in 1987.

Damage
Unlike Pi Vell, Pi Jove had escaped the attentions of vandals until more recently, due to its lower political profile and greater distance (200 m) from the road. In 2010, it was discovered with a circumferential cut through the bark, in addition to apparent shotgun damage. Vandals attacked it in June 2015, attempting to saw through one of its trunks, though it was not thought that the damage was serious enough to kill the affected trunk. As a precaution, in December 2015 arborists installed a frame to hold the three trunks together and ensure their stability. In January 2016, deeper chainsaw cuts were discovered on the already-damaged trunk which are believed harsh enough to kill the trunk altogether; these vandals also attacked Pi Vell.

The annual gathering
Pi de les Tres Branques, as a symbol of the united Catalan Countries, or simply of Catalan self-determination, has been the site of large political rallies since the turn of the 20th century, at first sporadically, but annually since 1980.

The first major rally was in 1904 when the Catalanist Union organised an assembly there to celebrate its acquisition of the site, on Sunday 25 September. The ceremony, and associated events in Berga the day before, attracted several hundred activists, with messages from foreign sympathisers being read out. Another rally was held in 1915.

The next major rally was held in 1921, on 25 July, the St. James holiday; a key point of that event included the inauguration of Pi Jove as the intended replacement for the original tree.

Subsequent political developments made it difficult to hold large organised rallies at the site. Catalan political gatherings were banned during the 1923–1930 dictatorship of Miguel Primo de Rivera, travel was difficult during the 1936–1939 Spanish Civil War, and political gatherings were again banned in Francoist Spain (1939–1975) and for some time after.

It was not until 1980, following the restoration of democracy in Spain, that the first annual gathering of the modern era took place, starting a tradition of a large gathering at the site on the third Sunday of July each year.

Attendance at the gathering has varied; the 1980 inaugural gathering attracted 3,000 visitors, reached a peak of 14,000 in 1986, but has since declined, with attendances of 2,000 in 2001, 1,000 in 2012 and 1,500 in 2014.

It attracts Catalan nationalists of many different viewpoints, including those attending a mass, political activists from the entire nationalist spectrum left and right giving speeches, organisations hosting stands and selling political books and souvenirs, and performers of traditional Catalan cultural activities such as sardana bands and dancers, castellers (human towers), and gegants (giant puppets). The gathering also marks the culmination of the four-day El Rebrot ("The Shoot") musical/political festival which has been held in Berga almost every year since 2001, organised by the Maulets/Arran left-wing youth organisation.

Because of the shortage of parking at the site, shuttle buses are provided by Berga town council, who also organise catering for the crowds in the town after the event.

Controversies
Events at the gathering have several times resulted in controversies, and clashes between rival political factions. Following the 1981 event, the Catalan parliament president Heribert Barrera, two parliamentary deputies, and several others, faced criminal charges of "insulting the feelings and unity of the Spanish nation and distributing illegal publications". The charges were dropped after three years. The 1986 gathering was marred by the burning of Spanish flags and harassment of moderate groups. As a result, the mainstream political parties Democratic Convergence and Republican Left stayed away from the 1987 event. In 1988, different factions of the far-left Movement for Defence of the Land (MDT) fought each other. In 1991, MDT militants attacked youth members of Democratic Convergence and Republican Left, and in 1996, hooded left-wing militants came from their assembly at Pi Jove to attack members of Estat Català at Pi Vell. Since the events of 1996, the authorities have increased security at the gathering, and the event has returned to a peaceful cultural atmosphere.

Management and development plans
Although both Pi Vell and Pi Jove are officially protected, they are easily accessible in an isolated wooded area, and therefore vulnerable to vandalism as well as natural hazards such as lightning and wildfire. Several proposals have been made over the years to improve the site.

Around 1990, a private business identified the Campllong valley, with Pi de les Tres Branques as a central attraction, as one of the possible locations for a large-scale Catalan-identity theme park called "Identirama". A different site was eventually selected, but the project was abandoned.

In 2003, the Catalan parliament passed a resolution urging development of a government plan to improve the site. A government report in 2001, re-published in 2004, included a proposal to cut down the fragile Pi Vell, leaving the stump in place along with a commemorative monument, and purchase and develop the site as a public amenity.

The attack on Pi Jove in 2010 prompted activists to complain about perceived ongoing lack of action by the authorities, and prompted the local municipality of Castellar del Riu to start work with interested parties to develop a plan to secure the site. In 2012 the mayor announced plans to take over the maintenance of the land around the two trees and develop facilities for visitors, including a car park and information panels.

In March 2015, following the serious attack on Pi Vell ten months before, the government set up a working group consisting of representatives of the Barcelona provincial administration, the local municipality, and the Institute of Catalan Studies, to manage the maintenance and protection of the two trees. The first result was the repair of the damaged tree in July, and in February 2016 they decided to place video security cameras at the site, watching both trees.

Other associated three-branched pines
Another similarly named tree is Pi de les Tres Branques de Freixinet, located near the village of Freixinet in the municipality of Riner in central Catalonia. This tree is also protected by the Catalan government, since 1988, but was killed in a forest fire in 1998.

In recent times, local bodies such as the municipality of Castellar del Riu or Berga or the local branch of the Catalan National Assembly, have adopted the practice of presenting a young three-branched pine tree or sapling claimed to be a descendant of Pi de les Tres Branques to other bodies, as symbols of solidarity. Early examples include presentations to the Castle of Gallifa in 1986, and the Castle of St. Ferran in Berga in 1992 (along with a sapling of the Tree of Guernica). The practice gained momentum following the February 2014 presentation of a young tree to the town of Folgueroles, to commemorate Jacint Verdaguer who was born there; that tree has since been vandalised. Subsequent 2014 recipients have included Andorra la Vella, Sant Hipòlit de Voltregà, and Saldes. The Forest Museum in Sant Celoni also claims to have five descendants of Pi de les Tres Branques in its grounds.

See also
 List of individual trees
 Catalan symbols

References

Notes

External links

 Video of the 2013 annual gathering at Pi de les Tres Branques

Individual pine trees
Catalan nationalism
Catalan symbols
Berguedà
Jacint Verdaguer
1910s individual tree deaths
Individual trees in Spain